The Young Communist League of Germany (abbreviated KJVD) was a political youth organization in Germany.

History
The KJVD was formed in 1920 from the Free Socialist Youth of the Communist Party of Germany, A prior youth wing had been formed in October 1918, with support from the Spartacus League. It was unable to attract new members and its membership peaked in the last years of the Weimar Republic at between 35,000 and 50,000. However, those who did join were commonly children of communist parents that were extremely devoted to the Communist Party.

Their activities included selling party newspapers, painting slogans, gluing posters, collecting dues, taking part in agitation, and they made up the voice choruses for Communist songs at demonstrations and other events. The KJVD had its own publishing house, the "Young Guard". The KJVD followed the Communist Party propaganda of attacking the Social Democratic Party of Germany as a proponent of "social fascism" resulting in hostility to the Social Democrats becoming a feature of the KJVD.

Political rifts between the KJVD and its parent organization, the Communist Party, appeared, including support by members of the KJVD for the young Communist intellectual Heinz Neumann who advocated increased use of physical violence against political enemies, including the Nazis.

Future leader of East Germany, Erich Honecker was a member of the KJVD and became KJVD leader of Saarland in 1931.

After the majority of the Independent Social Democratic Party of Germany joined the Communist Party of Germany at the end of 1920, the Independents' Socialist Workers Youth group followed suit and merged with the Communist Party's youth organization and then in 1925, became known as the Young Communists League.

In 2002 the KPD (1990) established their youth organisation, also calling it the KJVD.

List of chairmen
 Richard Gyptner (1920–1924)
  (1924–1925)
  (1925–1928)
  (1928–1929)
  (1929–1931)
  (1931–1932)
  (1932–1934)
  (1934–?)

See also
Young Communist League of Germany (Opposition)

References

Youth wings of communist parties
Historical youth wings of political parties in Germany
Communist Party of Germany